Luoshuidong railway station is a reserved railway station located in Hubei Province, People's Republic of China, on the Yichang–Wanzhou railway which is operated by Guangzhou Railway (Group) Corp.

Railway stations in Hubei